Tsui Hsiu-li (born 21 May 1973) is a Taiwanese table tennis player. She competed in the women's doubles event at the 2000 Summer Olympics.

References

1973 births
Living people
Taiwanese female table tennis players
Olympic table tennis players of Taiwan
Table tennis players at the 2000 Summer Olympics
Place of birth missing (living people)